Harcourt Road is a major highway in Admiralty, Hong Kong, connecting Central and Wan Chai. It starts at Murray Road and ends at Arsenal Street. The road is 780 metres in length and has four lanes of traffic on either side. The section of Harcourt Road westbound between Rodney Street and Cotton Tree Drive features a frontage road.

History

In the early 1840s when Hong Kong was colonized, the present-day Admiralty was planned to be of military use, the navy situated at the seafront and the army back on the hillside. That leaves in-between a rather large, elongated piece of land. In the 1870s, the Admiralty Dock was built on that stretch of land. Prior to its construction, the then governor, Sir Arthur Kennedy discussed the possibility of running a narrow public road through this land with the military officials but was rejected to protect military secrecy. Kennedy Road in the Mid-Levels was built as a replacement. Then for decades numerous attempts by different governors negotiating on this matter failed.

After World War II, the navy strength of the British Empire in the far east diminished, hence this piece of land containing the Admiralty Dock amongst others was returned to the government. The Admiralty dock finally ceased operating in November 1959 and was demolished soon after. Due to the rapid development of Central and Wan Chai, traffic congestions occurs frequently in the area and diverting traffic uphill to Kennedy Road is inconvenient.

So after the reclamation of parts of the dock, Harcourt Road was built and opened to public in 1961 to ease these problems. It was named after Cecil Harcourt of the Royal Navy who received Hong Kong from Japan after World War II, on 7 April the same year. Harcourt Road was once a waterfront promenade. The road has serious safety problems; 13 car accidents happened at the same curve of the road within six months. Hence on 13 August 1962, a speed limit was placed that traffic cannot exceed 35 km/h when passing that curve; this happened to be the first speed limit all over Hong Kong.

In January 2019, the Central–Wan Chai Bypass opened, providing a parallel expressway route to Harcourt Road, Gloucester Road, Victoria Park Road and Connaught Road Central.

Harcourt Road Flyover
The Harcourt Road Flyover at the western part of the road opened on 19 April 1966. To link Harcourt Road with Queen's Road East and Garden Road, the Albany Nullah was decked over and a new road built called Kapok Drive (now Cotton Tree Drive). These flyovers and slip roads opened in the late 1960s.

Events

From 28 September 2014 to 11 December 2014, the Umbrella Revolution took place. Harcourt Road, near to the Admiralty station, Government and Legislative Council Complex, transformed into Umbrella Square, was occupied for 79 days by pro-democracy protesters.

On 12 June 2019, protesters took place on Harcourt Road to oppose the extradition bill to China.

See also
 List of streets and roads in Hong Kong
 Hennessy Road
 Connaught Road Central
 Bank of America Tower

References

External links

 Google Maps of Harcourt Road

Former Part of Route 4 (Hong Kong)
Admiralty, Hong Kong
Roads on Hong Kong Island